The Australian Lightwing SP-6000 (or SP6000) was an Australian kit aircraft under development by Australian Lightwing of Ballina, New South Wales. The aircraft was intended to be supplied as a kit for amateur construction.

By 2017 the project's webpage had been removed and it was no longer listed on the company website. It is likely that development has ended.

Design and development
The aircraft was designed to comply with the Australian rules for amateur-built aircraft. It featured a cantilever low-wing or optionally strut-braced high-wing, a six-seat enclosed cabin, fixed tricycle landing gear and a single engine in tractor configuration.

The SP-6000's fuselage was intended to be made from fibreglass with the wing constructed of 6061-T6 aluminium, with S-glass control surfaces. It was to be powered by a Corvette LS3 automotive engine conversion, a  Lycoming IO-360 four-stroke aircraft engine or a turboprop powerplant. The cabin was planned include an optional toilet and galley.

The initial design was be unpressurized, but the company was considering a follow-on pressurized version.

Specifications (SP-6000 Low wing)

References

External links
Official website archive

Homebuilt aircraft
Single-engined tractor aircraft
Australian Lightwing aircraft